Special Warfare Command may refer to:
Republic of Korea Army Special Warfare Command
United States Naval Special Warfare Command

See also 
 Special Operations Command (disambiguation)
 Special Forces Command (disambiguation)